Codes is a hamlet located in the municipality of Maranchón, in Guadalajara province, Castilla–La Mancha, Spain. As of 2020, it has a population of 5.

Geography 
Codes is located 112km east-northeast of Guadalajara, Spain.

References

Populated places in the Province of Guadalajara